Jereb is a surname. Notable people with the surname include:

 Andraž Jereb (born 1992), Slovenian judoka
 Berta Jereb (born 1925), Slovenian oncologist and radiotherapist
 Sašo Jereb (born 1983), Slovenian judoka
 Žana Jereb (born 1984), Slovenian long-distance runner

See also
 

Slovene-language surnames